The Chiayi Performing Arts Center is an art center in Minxiong Township, Chiayi County, Taiwan.

History
The planning for the center began in 1995 and the construction started in 1997. Due to budget constraint, the construction was suspended twice in 1998 and 1999. The construction eventually completed in 2005. The first show performed at the center happened on 22-23 April 2005 and the center was officially opened on 10 May 2005.

Architecture
The center is built in a 6.1 hectares of land, which consists of auditorium, theater hall, rehearsal classroom, open air theater, art gallery, tourist service area, restaurant, shop, stage, pavilion etc.

Transportation
The arts center is accessible within walking distance south of Minxiong Station of Taiwan Railways.

See also
 List of tourist attractions in Taiwan

References

External links
  

2005 establishments in Taiwan
Buildings and structures in Chiayi County
Performing arts centers in Taiwan